"Cieli immensi" (Italian for "Immense Skies") is a song performed by Italian singer Patty Pravo, written by Fortunato Zampaglione. It was released as the first single from her 2016 album Eccomi.

The singer performed "Cieli immensi" at the 66th Sanremo Music Festival in February 2016 where it eventually placed at the 6th position and won the "Mia Martini" critics' award. The song was then made available digitally alongside its music video which attracted over 1 million YouTube views in 6 days and 3 million views in a month. The song was Patty's highest-charting single in Italy in over 10 years, reaching the top 20 on the back of its success at the festival.

Track listing
Streaming
 "Cieli immensi" – 4:15

Charts

Certifications

References

2016 songs
Italian songs
Patty Pravo songs
Sanremo Music Festival songs
Song recordings produced by Michele Canova
Songs written by Fortunato Zampaglione
Warner Music Group singles